Skippers are a family of the Lepidoptera (moths and butterflies) named the Hesperiidae. Being diurnal, they are generally called butterflies. They were previously placed in a separate superfamily, Hesperioidea; however, the most recent taxonomy places the family in the superfamily Papilionoidea, the butterflies. They are named for their quick, darting flight habits. Most have their antenna tips modified into narrow, hook-like projections. Moreover, skippers mostly have an absence of wing-coupling structure available in most moths. More than 3500 species of skippers are recognized, and they occur worldwide, but with the greatest diversity in the Neotropical regions of Central and South America.

Description and systematics

Traditionally, the Hesperiidae were placed in a monotypic superfamily Hesperioidea, because they are morphologically distinct from other Rhopalocera (butterflies), which mostly belong to the typical butterfly superfamily Papilionoidea. The third and rather small butterfly superfamily is the moth-butterflies (Hedyloidea), which are restricted to the Neotropics, but recent phylogenetic analyses suggest the traditional Papilionoidea are paraphyletic, thus the subfamilies should be reorganised to reflect true cladistic relationships.

Collectively, these three groups of butterflies share many characteristics, especially in the egg, larval, and pupal stages. Nevertheless, skippers have the antennae clubs hooked backward like a crochet hook, while the typical butterflies have club-like tips to their antennae, and moth-butterflies have feathered or pectinate (comb-shaped) antennae similar to moths. Skippers also have generally stockier bodies and larger compound eyes than the other two groups, with stronger wing muscles in the plump thorax, in this resembling many moths more than the other two butterfly lineages do. Unlike, for example, the Arctiinae, though, their wings are usually small in proportion to their bodies. Some have larger wings, but only rarely as large in proportion to the body as in other butterflies. When at rest, skippers keep their wings usually angled upwards or spread out, and only rarely fold them up completely.

The wings are usually well-rounded with more or less sharply tipped forewings. Some have prominent hindwing tails, and others have more angled wings; the skippers' basic wing shapes vary not much by comparison to the Papilionoidea, though. Most have a fairly drab coloration of browns and greys; some are more boldly black-and-white. Yellow, red, and blue hues are less often found, but some largely brown species are quite richly colored, too. Green colors and metallic iridescence are generally absent. Sexual dichromatism is present in some; males may have a blackish streak or patch of scent scales on their forewings.

Many species of skippers look very alike. For example, some species in the genera Amblyscirtes, Erynnis (duskywings), and Hesperia (branded skippers) cannot currently be distinguished in the field even by experts. The only reliable method of telling them apart involves dissection and microscopic examination of the genitalia, which have characteristic structures that prevent mating except between conspecifics.

Subfamilies

The roughly 3500 species of skippers are now classified in these subfamilies:
 Katreinae
 Coeliadinae – awls, awlets, and policemen (about 75 species)
 Euschemoninae – regent skipper (monotypic)
 Eudaminae – dicot skippers
 Chamundinae
 Pyrginae – spread-winged skippers and firetips (including Pyrrhopyginae)
 Tagiadinae
 Heteropterinae – skipperlings (about 150 species)
 Hesperiinae – grass skippers (over 2000 species)
 Megathyminae – giant skippers (about 18 species; doubtfully distinct from Hesperiinae)
 Barcinae
 Trapezitinae – Australian skippers (about 60 species)

References

 Ackery, P. R.; de Jong, R. & Vane-Wright, R. I. (1999). "The Butterflies: Hedyloidea, Hesperioidea and Papilionoidae". In: Kristensen, N. P. (ed.): Handbook of Zoology: A Natural History of the Phyla of the Animal Kingdom. Volume IV Arthropoda: Insecta, Part 35: Lepidoptera, Moths and Butterflies Vol.1: Evolution, Systematics, and Biogeography: 263–300. Walter de Gruyter, Berlin, New York.
 Brower, Andrew V. Z. & Warren, Andrew (April 7, 2008). "Hesperiidae". Tree of Life Web Project. Retrieved December 24, 2009.
 Brower, Andrew V. Z. & Warren, Andrew (2006). "The higher classification of the Hesperiidae (Lepidoptera: Hesperioidea)".  Retrieved October 26, 2012.
 Evans, W. H. (1951). "A Catalogue of the Hesperiidae indicating the classification and nomenclature adopted in the British Museum (Natural History). Part I. Pyrrhophyginae". London, British Museum. 92 pp. + p15. 1–9.
 Evans, W. H. (1952). "A Catalogue of the Hesperiidae indicating the classification and nomenclature adopted in the British Museum (Natural History). Part II. Pyrginae. Section I". London, British Museum. 178 pp. + pls. 10–25.
 Evans, W. H. (1953). "A Catalogue of the Hesperiidae indicating the classification and nomenclature adopted in the British Museum (Natural History). Part III. Pyrginae. Section II". London, British Museum. 246 pp. + pls. 26–53.
 Evans, W. H. (1955). "A Catalogue of the Hesperiidae indicating the classification and nomenclature adopted in the British Museum (Natural History). Part IV. Hesperiinae and Megathyminae". London, British Museum. 499 pp. + pls. 54–88.
 Heikkilä, M.; Kaila, L.; Mutanen, M.; Peña, C. & Wahlberg, N. (2012). "Cretaceous origin and repeated tertiary diversification of the redefined butterflies". Proceedings of the Royal Society B: Biological Sciences. 279(1731), 1093–1099.
 Kawahara, A. Y., & Breinholt, J. W. (2014). "Phylogenomics provides strong evidence for relationships of butterflies and moths". Proceedings of the Royal Society B: Biological Sciences. 281 (1788), 20140970.
 Korolev, Vladimir A. (2014). "Catalogus on the collection of Lepidoptera. Part I. Hesperiidae". Moscow, 310 p.

Further reading
 Glassberg, Jeffrey Butterflies through Binoculars, The West (2001)
 Guppy, Crispin S. and Shepard, Jon H. Butterflies of British Columbia (2001)
 James, David G. and Nunnallee, David Life Histories of Cascadia Butterflies (2011)
 Pelham, Jonathan Catalogue of the Butterflies of the United States and Canada (2008)
 Pyle, Robert Michael The Butterflies of Cascadia (2002)

External links

Nearctica North America (Index page)
Skippers of North America: Large format diagnostic photographs Cirrus Digital Imaging
Internet Archive Free download of Watson, E.Y. 1891 Hesperiidae Indicae: Being a reprint of descriptions of the Hesperiidae of India, Burma, and Ceylon

 
Butterfly families
Papilionoidea